Yaoli, Yao Li, or variation, may refer to: 

 Yaoli, Anhui, a town in Huoqiu County
 Yaoli, Jiangxi, a town in Fuliang County
 Yao Lee (born 1921, also Yao Li), Chinese singer
 Yao Li, assassin of the Spring and Autumn period

See also
 Li Yao (born 1992) Chinese handball player
 Yao (disambiguation)
 Lee (disambiguation)
 Li (disambiguation)